NGC 1255 is a barred spiral galaxy approximately 69 million light-years away from Earth in the constellation of Fornax.

Observational history 

NGC 1255 was discovered by American astronomer Edward Emerson Barnard on August 30, 1883 with the 6-inch refractor at Vanderbilt University. He described it as a "faint nebula, not large, pretty even in light. A faint star close p and slightly south probably involved. Star is s and f the nebula by about 30'".  American astronomer Ormond Stone made an independent discovery in 1886 with the 26" refractor at Leander McCormick Observatory, recording "4.1'x2.0', PA 315°".

Supernova SN 1980O 

Supernova SN 1980O of magnitude 17.0 was detected in NGC 1255 on October 30, 1980. It was discovered by German astronomer Hans-Emil Schuster with the 1.0-m Schmidt telescope. The supernova was classified as type II, and it was located at the following coordinates: RA 03h 13m 27s, Dec -25° 44.50′ (J2000 epoch). By December 30, 1980 the supernova had faded by about 4 magnitudes and showed strong P-Cyg-type profiles.

See also 
 Types and morphology of galaxies 
 Classification of supernovae 
 List of NGC objects (1001–2000)

References

External links 

 

Barred spiral galaxies
Fornax (constellation)
1255
12007
Astronomical objects discovered in 1883
Discoveries by Edward Emerson Barnard